Tu Tsai-hsing (born 21 February 1950) is a Taiwanese sports shooter. He competed at the 1984, 1988, 1992 and the 1996 Summer Olympics.

References

1950 births
Living people
Taiwanese male sport shooters
Olympic shooters of Taiwan
Shooters at the 1984 Summer Olympics
Shooters at the 1988 Summer Olympics
Shooters at the 1992 Summer Olympics
Shooters at the 1996 Summer Olympics
Shooters at the 1994 Asian Games
Shooters at the 1998 Asian Games
Place of birth missing (living people)
Asian Games competitors for Chinese Taipei
20th-century Taiwanese people